Air Inter Flight 696Y was a scheduled revenue passenger flight from Lyon–Bron Airport to Clermont-Ferrand Auvergne Airport, France. On 27 October 1972, the aircraft operating the flight, a Vickers Viscount 724, crashed during the final approach to Clermont Ferrand Auvergne Airport. Of the 68 occupants on board, 60 perished.

Accident 
On October 27, 1972, the Vickers Viscount 724 took off from Lyon–Bron Airport at 18:48, operating flight IT 696 to Clermont-Ferrand Auvergne Airport. In Clermont, most passengers would take a flight to Bordeaux from Paris.

The Vickers Viscount was carrying 63 passengers and 5 crew. He took off from Lyon in a violent storm, his last radio contact with the Lyon control tower at 7:20pm and did not respond to subsequent calls.

While approaching to land at Clermont-Ferrand Auvergne Airport, it crashed around 7:20 pm in the La Faye forest, almost on top of the Mont Picot massif at an altitude of 1000 meters, in the Forez Mountains. The accident occurred on the border of the departments of Loire, commune of Noirétable, and Puy-de-Dôme, commune of Viscomtat, with the massif between the two villages.

See also 

 Air Inter Flight 148

References 

Aviation accidents and incidents in 1972
Air Inter accidents and incidents
Aviation accidents and incidents in France
Accidents and incidents involving the Vickers Viscount
Aviation accidents and incidents involving controlled flight into terrain
1972 in France